Guillermo Enrique Orellana Riquelme (born 29 July 1986) is a Chilean professional footballer who plays for Coquimbo Unido in the Primera División de Chile as a goalkeeper.

Honours

Club
Universidad de Concepción
 Primera B (1): 2013–Transición
 Copa Chile (1): 2014–15

Coquimbo Unido
  Primera B (1): 2021

External links
 

1986 births
Living people
Footballers from Santiago
Association football goalkeepers
Chilean footballers
Cobresal footballers
Trasandino footballers
Puerto Montt footballers
Universidad de Concepción footballers
Coquimbo Unido footballers
Deportes Copiapó footballers
Deportes Temuco footballers
Chilean Primera División players
Tercera División de Chile players
Primera B de Chile players